Quetzalcoatlite is a rare tellurium oxysalt mineral with the formula Zn6Cu3(TeO6)2(OH)6 · AgxPbyClx+2y. It also contains large amounts of silver- and lead(II)chloride with the formula AgxPbyClx+2y (x+y≤2). It has a Mohs hardness of 3 and it crystallizes in the trigonal system. It has a deep blue color. It was named after Quetzalcoatl, the Aztec and Toltec god of the sea, alluding to its color. It is not to be confused with tlalocite, which has a similar color and habit.

Occurrence 
Quetzalcoatlite was first identified in the Bambollita mine (La Oriental), Moctezuma, Municipio de Moctezuma, Sonora, Mexico. It was later also found in another nearby mine, the Moctezuma mine, and it has also been found in mines in Arizona, Utah and California. It occurs as a rare mineral in the oxidized zone of tellurium-bearing hydrothermal deposits and it is often associated with hessite, galena, bornite, cerussite, azurite, chlorargyrite, teineite, quartz, baryte, khinite, dugganite, and gold.

References 

Trigonal minerals
Minerals in space group 164
Oxide minerals
Zinc minerals
Copper(II) minerals
Lead minerals
Silver minerals
Tellurate and selenate minerals
Minerals described in 1974